Wiśniew  is a village in Siedlce County, Masovian Voivodeship, in east-central Poland. It is the seat of the gmina (administrative district) called Gmina Wiśniew.

The village has a population of 870.

References

Villages in Siedlce County
Lublin Voivodeship (1474–1795)
Siedlce Governorate
Lublin Governorate
Lublin Voivodeship (1919–1939)